Malmö FF competed in Allsvenskan and Svenska Cupen for the 1943/44 season. For the first time the club won both competitions. The season was the beginning of a very successful era in Malmö FF's history as the club would finish within the first three positions in the league table for nine more seasons, winning five Swedish championships and five cup championships in the process.

Players

Squad stats

|}

Club

Other information

Competitions

Overall

Allsvenskan

Results summary

League table

References
 

1943–44
Malmo FF
Swedish football clubs 1943–44 season
1943–44